Battlezone is an arcade game released by Stainless Games in 2008. It is an update of Battlezone, the arcade classic vector graphics tank shooter.  The game features an update of the game with new gameplay features, as well as a port of the original.

Gameplay
The game features two modes, Evolved and Classic, both feature two difficulty settings Normal and Throttle Monkey.

Evolved
Evolved gameplay is an update of the original game. It features the core mechanics of the classic mode while adding Deathmatch, Team Deathmatch, and Capture the Flag multiplayer modes, 1080i graphics, Dolby 5.1 audio and support for Xbox Live Vision.

Classic
Classic gameplay is unchanged from the original, however, Achievements and Leaderboards are added.

Features
It features 1080i graphics, Dolby 5.1 audio and an online mode to play against 2 - 4 friends in Deathmatch and Capture the Flag modes, and incorporates Xbox Live Vision support enabling players to see their friends during play.

Reception
The game has received generally mixed reviews.  While acclaimed for "the gameplay appeal to make it worth a look" and "the additions made by Atari and Stainless give that much more value" but others have said "The simple appeal of 3D tank combat is one that certainly has a place on a service like XBLA, but this awkward update gets stuck between misplaced reverence for the original and distracting concessions to modern gaming conventions."

See also
 Battlezone, 1998 reimagining of the 1980 game
 Battlezone, 2016 remake of the 1980 game

References

External links
Battlezone details at Developer's site

2008 video games
Atari games
First-person shooters
Video game remakes
Video games scored by Cris Velasco
Video games developed in the United Kingdom
Xbox 360 games
Xbox 360-only games
Xbox 360 Live Arcade games
Multiplayer and single-player video games
Stainless Games games